Josselyn's Wife is a 1926 silent crime drama directed by Richard Thorpe and starring Pauline Frederick. It was produced and distributed by the Tiffany Pictures company. A previous film was released in 1919 as Josselyn's Wife.

This film is incomplete at BFI National Film and Television Archive in London.

Cast
Pauline Frederick - Lillian Josselyn
Holmes Herbert - Thomas Josselyn
Armand Kaliz - Pierre Marchand
Josephine Hill - Ellen Marchand
Carmelita Geraghty - Flo
Freeman Wood - Mr. Arthur
Pat Harmon - Detective
Ivy Livingston - Maid
William A. Carroll - Butler

References

External links
Josselyn's Wife at IMDb.com

1926 films
American silent feature films
Films directed by Richard Thorpe
Tiffany Pictures films
American crime drama films
1926 crime drama films
American black-and-white films
Remakes of American films
1920s American films
Silent American drama films